Vijay Shinde (born on 26 November) is an Indian filmmaker, writer and film director.  He has directed several Marathi and Hindi films like Ragging Ek Vikruti (2011), The Strugglers (2012), Veeda Ek Sangharsh (2017), Dostigiri (2018), Shiva (2019), Kalakendra (not released), Abhinav (under production), and Anubhuti (under production).

Career 
Vijay Shinde directed several Marathi and Hindi films. Also written and Edited films.

Filmography

Film credits

References

1980 births
Living people
Indian screenwriters
21st-century Indian film directors
Indian editors
Indian producers